Charles H. Ellis III (born July 8, 1958) is an American Apostolic Pentecostal preacher and the former Presiding Bishop of the Pentecostal Assemblies of the World. He is the pastor of the Greater Grace Temple, a megachurch in Detroit, Michigan, succeeding his father, Bishop David L. Ellis, Sr.

Career 
Ellis graduated from Wayne State University in 1983. In 1996, Ellis assumed leadership of Greater Grace Temple upon the death of his father, David L. Ellis. In 2002, the church moved to its new building, “The City of David,” a 19-acre complex first envisioned by his father. Ellis used the new building's hydraulic floors for productions, including the funerals of Rosa Parks, Emanuel Steward, Levi Stubbs, and Ron Banks. Under Ellis, the Greater Grace Temple has also become known for its illustrated sermons, which dramatize the gospel. At presentations of “The Whip, Hammer & Cross” and “To Hell and Back” as many as 5,000 people attend the congregation.

In 2010, Ellis was elected as the 10th Presiding Bishop of the Pentecostal Assemblies of the World. In 2015, Ellis was featured in Oxygen's series Preachers of Detroit, a spin-off of its Preachers of L.A. series.

Prayer Day for Auto Workers 
In 2008 Bishop Ellis and Greater Grace Temple called for a "Prayer Day for Auto Workers" because of the ongoing automotive industry crisis. He prayed for the autoworkers at an altar surrounded by three SUVs and told them that God would not fail them. He told The New York Times, “We have never seen as midnight an hour as we face this coming week,” Bishop Ellis said, referring to the possibility that Congress would soon vote on a deal to give the carmakers enough money to stay afloat into next year.  I don't know what's going to happen, but we need prayer,” he said. “When it’s all said and done, we’re all in this thing together.”

Ariana Grande 
Bishop Ellis was accused of groping singer Ariana Grande while hugging her from the side, holding her high above the waist with his hand around the side of her chest, while he thanked her at the televised funeral of Aretha Franklin. Ellis released an apology following coverage of the incident in the press, saying that it was not his intention and that he had hugged all the performers. In the statement, Ellis also apologized for joking that he thought Ariana Grande's name was a Taco Bell product.

References

External links 

 Greater Grace Temple profile

1958 births
Living people
Clergy of historically African-American Christian denominations
American Pentecostal pastors
Clergy from Detroit
American television evangelists
21st-century African-American people
20th-century African-American people